Mooga is an album by the rapper 40 Cal., released in 2008.

Production
Some of the tracks were produced by unknown musicians found via Myspace.

Critical reception
Exclaim! called the album full of "hard beats and venomous lyrics," writing that "there are various standout tracks on Mooga and chances are the listener may have a hard time choosing which one is the strongest."

Track listing
 40 Intro (produced by M.G.I.)
 Shooters On Deck (produced by Skyz Muzik)
 On My Sh*t (featuring Sudaboss) (produced by Los)
 Movie Shoot (produced by Chinky P)
 Ten Stacks (produced by Chinky P)
 Rewind That (produced by Mel Staxx)
 Harlem Shuffle (featuring JR Writer)
 Hustlas Anthem (featuring S.A.S.) (produced by Srada)
 Googa Googa (produced by Konstantine Jones)
 Cuarenta (produced by Lounge Lizards)
 Spit How I Live It (produced by Doeboy)
 New Beginning (featuring Duke Da God) (produced by A the Arketek)
 Grown Man Bills
 Heartbeat (produced by GQ Beats)
 Heatin' Up (produced by Cookin' Soul)
 Memories (produced by X.O.)

References

2008 albums
40 Cal. albums